Kenilworth Park can refer to:

 Kenilworth Park (Portland, Oregon), United States
 Kenilworth Park and Aquatic Gardens, a national park in Washington, D.C., United States
 Kenilworth Park Racetrack, former racetrack near Windsor, Ontario, Canada

Disambiguation pages